The men's pole vault event at the 1971 European Athletics Indoor Championships was held on 14 March in Sofia.

Results

References

Pole vault at the European Athletics Indoor Championships
Pole